Waldbach is a river of Hesse, Germany. At its confluence with the Sauerbornsbach in Schwalbach am Taunus, the Schwalbach is formed.

See also
List of rivers of Hesse

Rivers of Hesse
Rivers of the Taunus
Rivers of Germany